Sathyamangalam was a state assembly constituency in Tamil Nadu. Elections and winners in the constituency are listed below. The constituency was in existence from 1957 to 2010 after which it was merged with Bhavani Sagar.

Madras State

Tamil Nadu

Election results

2006

2001

1996

1991

1989

1984

1980

1977

1971

1967

1962

1957

References

External links
 

Former assembly constituencies of Tamil Nadu